Tigasin is a 1999 action comedy film directed by Ike Jarlego Jr. The film stars Victor Neri and Eddie Garcia. It was one of the entries in the 1999 Manila Film Festival.

Plot
2 police officers are investigating the string of mysterious deaths due to fake Viagra being sold illegally. They suspect a group of roving merchants, which lead them to the source. Despite killing the ringleader, they find out that a slew of victims are seduced by a mysterious woman, which is revealed to be the true ringleader.

Cast

 Eddie Garcia as Greg Marcial
 Victor Neri as Ramon Ignacio
 Alma Concepcion as Jessica
 Alvin Anson as Rex
 Peque Gallaga as Mr. Pablo
 Lito Legaspi as Col. Angeles
 Manjo del Mundo as Carlos
 Rez Cortez as Roxas
 Jean Saburit as  	Mrs. Roxas
 Amy Perez as Bisayang Promo Lady
 Roldan Aquino as Mr. Khorami
 Archi Adamos as Driver
 Gino Paul Guzman as Lookout
 Augusto Victa as Lolo
 Dexter Doria as Mrs. Santos
 Ester Chavez as Victim's Wife
 Ogie Diaz as Gay Attendant
 Idda Yaneza as Mrs. Reale
 Gandong Cervantes as Mr. Antonio
 Robert Talby as Wilfredo
 Ed Aquino as Chemist
 Archie Ventosa as Lab Personnel
 Nikka Ruiz as Promo Head
 Janet Diaz as Twiggy
 Gloria Garcia as Tomboy
 Joseph dela Paz as Fat Cook
 Janice Manuba as Assistant Chemist
 Eric Jimenez as Bert
 Kevin Cabaluna as Reporter
 Dianne Sandico as Young Prostitute
 Apolinario Reyes as Dead Lolo
 Jenny de Guzman as Club Dancer
 Danny Celis as Dead Husband
 Reggie Sison as Dead Gay

References

External links
 
 

1999 films
1999 action films
Philippine action comedy films
Star Cinema films
Films directed by Ike Jarlego Jr.